Topcraft Co., Ltd. (株式会社トップクラフト Kabushiki-gaisha Toppukurafuto, also written as "Top Craft") was an animation studio established on February 1, 1972 by former Toei Animation producer Toru Hara, and located in Tokyo, Japan. It was famous for the production of Nausicaä of the Valley of the Wind and for doing animation for hand-drawn animation titles by Rankin/Bass Productions (New
York City, USA). The studio went bankrupt and dissolved on June 15, 1985, essentially splitting the studio in half. Hayao Miyazaki, Toshio Suzuki and Isao Takahata acquired the assets and formed Studio Ghibli. Topcraft's founder, Toru Hara, became Studio Ghibli's first manager. Topcraft's animators later formed another studio, called Pacific Animation Corporation, to continue working with Rankin/Bass on television shows like ThunderCats and Silverhawks, but eventually joined Ghibli once Pacific Animation was bought out by The Walt Disney Company and became Walt Disney Animation Japan. Some animators, like Tsuguyuki Kubo, went to work for other studios, such as Studio Pierrot, working on Naruto and Bleach for them. Toru Hara died on December 14, 2021 at the age of 85.

History 
Despite suggestions otherwise, the transition from Topcraft's demise into the formation of Studio Ghibli is not clear. Ghibli was founded after the advice of Tokuma Shoten and the success of Topcraft's Nausicaä of the Valley of the Wind.

Works

Productions

Co-productions

Collaborative works in partnership with Rankin/Bass

Contributive works

References

External links 
 
 Topcraft at IMDb
 co-productions database

 
Japanese animation studios
Defunct mass media companies of Japan
Film production companies of Japan
Mass media companies established in 1971
Mass media companies disestablished in 1985
Japanese companies established in 1971
Studio Ghibli
Japanese companies disestablished in 1985